Thomas Perceval Magee (1797-1857) was an Anglican Archdeacon in Ireland in the late nineteenth century: in 1831 Daniel O'Connell stated in the British House of Houses that he held 11 livings.

Magee was educated at Trinity College, Dublin. He was a Prebendary of Christ Church Cathedral, Dublin and Archdeacon of Kilmacduagh from 1830 until his death on 16 December 1857.

His nephew was Archbishop of York for a short period in 1891.

Notes

Alumni of Trinity College Dublin
Archdeacons of Kilmacduagh
19th-century Irish Anglican priests
1797 births
1857 deaths